The 1979–80 AHL season was the 44th season of the American Hockey League. Ten teams were scheduled to play 80 games each. The New Haven Nighthawks finished first overall in the regular season. The Hershey Bears won their sixth Calder Cup championship.

Team changes
 The Adirondack Red Wings join the AHL as an expansion team, based in Glens Falls, New York, playing in the North Division.
 The Philadelphia Firebirds move to Syracuse, New York becoming the Syracuse Firebirds.

Final standings
Note: GP = Games played; W = Wins; L = Losses; T = Ties; GF = Goals for; GA = Goals against; Pts = Points;

Scoring leaders

Note: GP = Games played; G = Goals; A = Assists; Pts = Points; PIM = Penalty minutes

 complete list

Calder Cup playoffs

Trophy and award winners
Team awards

Individual awards

Other awards

See also
List of AHL seasons

References
AHL official site
AHL Hall of Fame
HockeyDB

 
American Hockey League seasons
2
2